explodingdog is the name of a website run by Sam Brown, pseudonym of Adam Culbert. From 2000 to 2015, viewers e-mailed Brown short phrases for inspiration and he illustrated certain ones.  The drawings are usually rendered digitally and are known for their simplistic style, and their poignant and sometimes unexpected take on the phrases on which they are based. Sam Brown has published limited-run print books of his explodingdog illustrations.  He also sells merchandise with explodingdog illustrations and prints of the daily drawings to help offset costs.

Themes and Visual Motifs
Like many artists, Sam Brown uses many recurring themes and visual motifs in his explodingdog work.

A short list of visual motifs:
Stick figures 
Red robots 
Fish (frequently yellow) 
Stars 
Clouds 
Monsters
Menacing cityscapes 
Snakes 
Ducks 
Dogs 
Dictators
Orange cones, which are, apparently, a game of sorts
Rockets

A short list of recurring themes:
 Loss 
 Love 
 Joy 
 Loneliness 
 Menace 
 Confusion 
 Freedom

Influence
Over the years, there have been a number of different artistic projects inspired by explodingdog.  These sites usually utilize the same "submitted by random people, and selected for inspiration" concept that explodingdog pioneered.

Webcomics
Whispered Apologies — An inversion of the explodingdog format in which artists submit comics to the site, and writers give the submitted comics text.
Boring3D
Diesel Sweeties – Traditional webcomic
NatalieDee – Daily webcomic
Critter Cuddles - Publishes a webcomic daily with daily drawings by email.

Music sites
Song Fight! — Originally started as a musical explodingdog spinoff, now a songwriting contest between multiple artists.
Request-A-Song.com The artists at this site took song title requests and turned them into original songs.
Songs To Wear Pants To this site will take any user submission of text/genre and turn it into a song.

References

External links
 explodingdog
 July 2001 Interview at The Morning News
 Three Imaginary Girls, July 2004
 gel talk, May 2003
 Austin Chronicle, March 2005
 Bostonist, July 2006
 NY Times, April 10, 2003
 Wired, Nov 2000
 

2000s webcomics
2010s webcomics
2000 webcomic debuts
2015 webcomic endings
American webcomics
Webcomics in print